Saba Bank in the Caribbean Netherlands is the largest submarine atoll in the Atlantic Ocean and has some of the richest diversity of marine life in the Caribbean Sea. In 2010 it was designated as "Saba Bank National Park", one of the National Parks of the Netherlands and was officially recognized as such in 2012.

The National Park was established to provide protection to the biodiversity of the bank. The marine life there consists of humpback whales, sea turtles, over 200 species of fish, and many kinds of sea birds. The bank is highly valued to other close reefs, acting as a source of coral larvae and fish that then spread throughout nearby coral reefs in the region. In the past, the bank has been damaged by anchors from ships and tankers while loading oil, and began to deteriorate in color and size.

The bank lies completely underwater and is important from both a biological and economic perspective.

Geography

In depths of under , the bottom can be distinctly seen.

Largest and deepest marine sinkholes in the world
In 2019, the Royal Netherlands Institute for Sea Research (NIOZ) and Wageningen Marine Research organized an expedition to the Saba Bank, close to the Dutch island of Saba in the Caribbean region. Expert researchers gathered data to acquire more knowledge about sinkholes. When the bank lay above water during the ice ages and the sea level was  lower than it is now, flowing freshwater dissolved the limestone and created large holes. This first led to the formation of caves, which subsequently collapsed. Interestingly enough, these sinkholes that developed on land were subsequently submerged after the last ice age (20,000 years ago), when the sea level rose again. Later, researchers discovered that the sinkhole seemed to seep gas. Researchers then obtained coordinates of a purported hot-spring in one of the sinkholes that could have possibly seeped methane.

Politics
About one third of the Saba Bank lies within the Saba territorial waters, a  zone. Around it is an Exclusive Economic Zone of the Netherlands of  outside the coastal baseline, which replaced the Economic Fisheries Zone established before the dissolution of the Netherlands Antilles.

References

External links
 PLoS ONE: Biodiversity of Saba Bank
Sailing Directions, Caribbean Sea, Vol. I
Government Environmental Information
https://www.dcnanature.org/saba-bank/
https://lacgeo.com/saba-bank-atoll-national-park
https://www.saba-news.com/saba-bank-has-the-deepest-and-largest-marine-sinkholes-in-the-world/

Landforms of Saba